Andrew Griffiths (born January 11, 1969) is a former field hockey forward from Canada. He is currently the head coach of the Old Dominion Lady Monarchs field hockey team.

International senior competitions
 1989 – World Cup Qualifier, Madison, USA (2nd)
 1990 – World Cup, Lahore (11th)
 1991 – Pan American Games, Havana (2nd)
 1991 – Olympic Qualifier, Auckland (6th)
 1993 – World Cup Qualifier, Poznan (7th)
 1995 – Pan American Games, Mar del Plata (2nd)
 1996 – Olympic Qualifier, Barcelona (6th)
 1996 – World Cup Preliminary, Sardinia (2nd)
 1997 – World Cup Qualifier, Kuala Lumpur (5th)
 1998 – World Cup, Utrecht (8th)
 1999 – Sultan Azlan Shah Cup, Kuala Lumpur (4th)
 1999 – Pan American Games, Winnipeg (1st)
 2000 – Sultan Azlan Shah Cup, Kuala Lumpur (7th)
 2000 – Americas Cup, Cuba (2nd)
 2000 – Olympic Games, Sydney (10th)

References

 Profile

External links

 Planet Field Hockey

1969 births
Living people
Canadian male field hockey players
Canadian expatriate sportspeople in England
Olympic field hockey players of Canada
Field hockey players at the 2000 Summer Olympics
Pan American Games gold medalists for Canada
Pan American Games silver medalists for Canada
Field hockey players at the 1991 Pan American Games
Field hockey players at the 1995 Pan American Games
Field hockey players at the 1999 Pan American Games
Canadian people of Welsh descent
English emigrants to Canada
Sportspeople from Sheffield
Field hockey players from Toronto
Pan American Games medalists in field hockey
1998 Men's Hockey World Cup players
Male field hockey forwards
Medalists at the 1995 Pan American Games
Medalists at the 1991 Pan American Games